Bodallin is a town located around half way between Merredin and Southern Cross in Western Australia.

History
The town takes its name from the railway siding of this name, established between 1894 and 1897. When gazetted in 1918 the town was spelt Boddalin. This was amended in 1947 to Bodallin.

In 1932 the Wheat Pool of Western Australia announced that the town would have two grain elevators, each fitted with an engine, installed at the railway siding.

It is a stop on the Prospector rural train service, and is a location of a crossing loop on the railway.

The main industry in town is wheat farming with the town being a Cooperative Bulk Handling receival site.

Rail services
The Prospector service, which runs each way between East Perth and Kalgoorlie once or twice each day, stops at Bodallin.

See also
 Eastern Goldfields Railway

References

External links

Towns in Western Australia
Wheatbelt (Western Australia)
Grain receival points of Western Australia